Imperial Iranian Air Force Flight 48, was a military cargo flight from Tehran, Iran, to McGuire Air Force Base in the United States with a stopover in Madrid, Spain. On May 9, 1976, the Boeing 747-131 freighter operating the flight crashed during its approach to Madrid, killing all 17 people on board.

Aircraft 

The aircraft involved was a five year old Boeing 747-131 (serial number 19677 and line number 73) which made its first flight on September 15, 1970. On September 26, the aircraft was delivered to Trans World Airlines (TWA) with registration N53111.

On October 15, 1975, the aircraft was returned to the Boeing factory in Wichita, Kansas. It was converted into a freighter cargo model (747-131F), during which time a large cargo door was added on the left side.

In October 1975, the aircraft was sold to the Imperial Iranian Air Force with serial number 5-283. The IIAF received the aircraft on November 1. The aircraft was powered by four Pratt & Whitney JT9D-3B turbofan engines.

The aircraft's last maintenance check was performed by the Iranian Air Force on May 4, 1976, after which it flew for 16 hours. During the subsequent investigation, it would be determined that American specialists were unaware of the check's results.

Accident 
Flight ULF48 took off from Mehrabad airport in Tehran at 08:20 GMT bound for New Jersey, via Madrid. There were 10 crew members and seven passengers on board. The fuel was a mixture of type JP-4 and Jet-A. The aircraft's weight and centering were within required limits.

At 14:15, Flight 48 contacted the Madrid Air Route Traffic Control Center and reported that the estimated landing time would be 14:40. At 14:19, the Madrid ARTCC controller told the flight that they were identified on the radar screens and cleared the flight to descend to the CPL VOR via the Castejon radio beacon. At 14:22, the crew received the weather conditions at the airport; at 14:25, they were cleared to descend to FL100. The crew acknowledged and began descent.

A cyclone had passed over Spain earlier in the day, along with strong thunderstorms. However, visibility was good, and no dangerous weather alerts were issued by the weather service. At 14:30, the crew diverted to the left of their assigned route due to bad weather. At 14:33, the crew contacted Madrid approach and reported more bad weather ahead, subsequently requesting to deviate away from it.

The approach controller reported that he had established radar contact, and then asked the crew to confirm their instructions. The crew confirmed, and reported passing the Castejon radio beacon. The controller instructed them to maintain a heading of 260°. This was the last transmission from Flight ULF48.

The crew was aware that they were flying into poor weather conditions, but none of them expressed any concern until 14:34, when a crew member said, "We're in the soup!" Three seconds later, two witnesses on the ground reported seeing lightning strike the aircraft, followed by an explosion on the left wing near engine #1 (outer left). The left wing exploded into three large parts, and then disintegrated into 15 fragments. 

At this time, the Flight Data Recorder stopped recording, but the Cockpit Voice Recorder continued to record. The autopilot disconnect warning was then heard. Unaware of the loss of the left wing, the crew tried to regain control of the crippled aircraft in vain. All 17 people on board were killed and the aircraft was destroyed.

Investigation 
The Iranian Air Force and the United States National Transportation Safety Board investigated the accident.

It was established that a bolt of lightning struck the fuselage near the cockpit and exited the left wing's static discharger located at the wingtip. This created a spark in fuel tank number 1 (which contained  fuel), igniting fuel vapor in the tank.

It is most likely that the ignition spark originated from an open circuit in a fuel valve's wiring. The explosion led to part of the wing trim separating and damage to the side members; as a result, the air flow deteriorated sharply and the wings began to bend significantly. As the flight was passing through an area of turbulence at high speed, the wing experienced major mechanical stress. The entire left wing separated just seconds later.

The NTSB could not determine if the wing separated due to the explosion or the stress.

See also 

 Similar accidents
 TWA Flight 891 – lightning strike
 Pan Am Flight 214 – lightning strike and fuel tank explosion
 LANSA Flight 508 – lightning strike
 TWA Flight 800 – fuel tank explosion

Notes and References

Notes

References 

Aviation accidents and incidents caused by lightning strikes
Accidents and incidents involving the Boeing 747
Aviation accidents and incidents in Spain
Aviation accidents and incidents in 1983
Aviation accidents and incidents involving in-flight explosions
1976 meteorology
1976 in Spain
May 1976 events in Europe
History of Madrid
Pages with unreviewed translations
1970s in Madrid
Accidents and incidents involving military aircraft
Aviation accidents and incidents caused by in-flight structural failure